Ian Christopher Elsby (born 13 September 1960) is an English former footballer who played for Port Vale, Cleveland Cobras, Macclesfield Town and Congleton Town. His uncle is the former footballer Jim Elsby.

Career
Elsby graduated from the Port Vale youth team to sign as a professional in May 1978. He was immediately sent out to the USA on loan with Jimmy Melia's American Soccer League side Cleveland Cobras, but returned to Vale Park by August of that year. He played five Fourth Division games under Dennis Butler in 1978–79, before becoming a first team regular under new boss John McGrath from February 1980 to the end of the 1979–80 season. He scored his first goal in the Football League on 9 February 1980, in a 1–1 draw with Huddersfield Town. He fell out of favour the next season though, and was restricted to 23 appearances before being handed a free transfer in May 1981. He moved on to Macclesfield Town (Northern Premier League) and Congleton Town. He was voted Macclesfield's Player of the Year in 1981–82 and won the Cheshire Senior Cup in 1983. In summer 1986 he was in a car crash with teammates Nigel Shaw, Steve Waddington and Trevor Brissett.

Career statistics
Source:

Honours
Individual
Macclesfield Town F.C. Player of the Year: 1981–82

Macclesfield Town
Cheshire Senior Cup: 1983

References

Footballers from Stoke-on-Trent
English footballers
Association football midfielders
Port Vale F.C. players
English expatriate footballers
Expatriate soccer players in the United States
Cleveland Cobras players
Macclesfield Town F.C. players
Congleton Town F.C. players
English Football League players
Northern Premier League players
1960 births
Living people
English expatriate sportspeople in the United States